Meldola is a town and comune near Forlì, in Emilia-Romagna, Italy.

History
The area of Meldola was inhabited since very ancient times. The Romans built here a large aqueduct (still existing under the ground) which served the military port of Classis. To the 5th-6th century belongs a large patrician villa which is now under the historical centre.

In the Middle Ages a castle was present, the name Meldola first attested around the year 1000. The castle was a possession of the Montefeltro, Ordelaffi, Malatesta, the Borghese Aldobrandini and the Doria Pamphilj. It gained the status of city in 1862, soon after the unification of Italy.

Main sights
Rocca (castle)
Castle of Teodorano, outside the city. Of the originary fortified burgh, destroyed by Cesare Borgia, a tower and part of the walls remain.
Church of the Madonna del Sasso (1523). It is now home to the Ecology Museum.
Churches of San Cosimo and San Nicolò.
Ponte dei Veneziani (Venetians' Bridge), a 5-arch bridge dating from the early 16th-century.
Scardavilla Wood preserved area
Rocca delle Caminate fortress, which was a summer residence of Benito Mussolini

Government

List of mayors

Economy
In the late 19th century and in the first years of 20th century, Meldola was well known for its production of silk. The main activities include agriculture and the manufacture of furniture. A recently built oncology hospital provides research into cancer and care for cancer patients.

Notable people
The following notable persons were born in Meldola: the philosopher and theologian Bartolomeo Mastri; the patriot Felice Orsini; the painter Maria Giuditta Versari. Japan football coach 
Alberto Zaccheroni was also born in Meldola.

References